Cloughmills or Cloghmills is a village in County Antrim, Northern Ireland. Ballymoney is 9 miles to the north-west and Ballymena is 10 miles to the south. It had a population of 1,309 people in the 2011 Census. It is in Causeway Coast and Glens District Council.

Name
The name Cloughmills/Cloghmills is a combination of the Irish word cloch (meaning "stone") and the English word mill (referring to the linen mill around which the village grew). An older spelling was Clochmills.

Features
Cloghmills is a local service centre for its surrounding rural hinterland with a good range of retail, commercial, community and educational facilities. Recreational facilities are, however, limited, relative to the size of the village. A substantial number of private sector dwellings have been built over the past decade, which reflect its growing residential function.

Three private housing developments have been built in the village, substantially increasing the population to approximately 2000 individuals in 2008. The Cloughmills Community Action Team (CCAT), made up of local residents, is in the process of reviving a five-year action plan to develop the village for the all who live there, and promote and develop local business initiatives. Cloughmills is home to one of Northern Ireland's leading department stores, Logans of Cloughmills and Boyd Hampers which was established by Andrew and Gareth Boyd in 2001.

History
The industrial heritage of the village can be seen from the old linen mill which is located at the bottom end of the main street beside the medical centre. The mill was fed by the Cloughwater (also known as the Cloughmills Water) river which flows through the southern end of the village. This river feeds into the River Main.

The population was about 200.

The former main employer of the village, Cooneen Textiles, a clothing firm, closed down in 1999 with the loss of 128 jobs. The premises changed hands and Cooneen was replaced by a haulage company called Reid Transport. In November 2007 Reid Transport ceased trading with loss of 200 jobs following serious financial difficulties. The African Clothing Company took up residence in the vacated premises later changing its name to All-Tex Recyclers.

The Troubles
On 12 February 1977, an off duty Royal Ulster Constabulary (RUC) member, Samuel McKane (aged 33), was killed by the IRA outside his home in Cloughmills.

On 14 March 1978, Provisional Irish Republican Army (IRA) masked gunmen planted two explosive devices at the Cloughmills Cooperative Society and Spar supermarket complex. The homemade explosive devices exploded causing minor structural damage and starting a fire which destroyed the interior.

On 18 June 1986 the Provisional Irish Republican Army held a man a gun point and forced him to drive a 500lb bomb to Cloughmills Police Station. The man was able to raise the alarm but the bomb exploded and caused severe damage to the police station and nearby primary school and houses.

Transport
Cloughmills has good road links to Ballymoney and Ballymena and is located a short distance east of the A26 key transport corridor. However, it has limited public transport connections.

Education

Cloughmills Primary School
St Brigid's Primary School

Religion
Killagan Church of Ireland Parish Church
Cloughmills Free Presbyterian Church
Cloughmills Reformed Presbyterian Church
Ballyweaney Presbyterian Church
Church of the Sacred Heart (Roman Catholic)
Ballynaloob Gospel Hall (Gospel Hall Assemblies)

Demography

2011 Census
It had a population of 1,309 people (514 households) in the 2011 Census.

On Census day in 2011:
32.7% were from a Catholic background and 63.0% were from a Protestant background

Notable people 

 Alan McGuckian SJ (born 1953), Roman Catholic prelate and current Bishop of Raphoe

International relations

Twin towns - Sister cities
 Benbrook, Texas, USA
 Vanves, France

References

Villages in County Antrim